HMS Cheerful was a 30-knot, three-funnel torpedo boat destroyer built by Hawthorn Leslie. She was ordered by the Royal Navy under the 1896–1897 Naval Estimates, launched in 1898 and saw action during World War I. She was mined off the Shetland Islands in 1917 and sank with the loss of 44 officers and men.

Construction
She was laid down on 7 September 1896, at the R.W. Hawthorn Leslie and Company shipyard at Hebburn-on-Tyne, and launched on 14 July 1897. She was completed and accepted by the Royal Navy in February 1900, and passed into the Medway Fleet Reserve at Chatham.

Service
After commissioning she was assigned to the Chatham Division of the Harwich Flotilla. She was deployed in home waters for her entire service life. On 6 March 1900 she was commissioned at Chatham to take the place of HMS Mermaid in the Medway instructional flotilla, with Commander Mark Kerr transferring from Mermaid to take command of Cheerful. In April 1900 she was present at an accident at Brighton's West Pier, when seven sailors from HMS Desperate were drowned in bad weather as they approached the pier.

On 30 August 1912 the Admiralty directed all destroyer classes were to be designated by letters.  She was assigned to the  along with the other 3-funnel, 30-knot destroyers.  After 30 September 1913 she was known as a C-class destroyer and had the letter ‘C’ painted on the hull below the bridge area and on either the fore or aft funnel. Between 1912 and 1914 she had a wireless radio set installed.

Her duties included anti-submarine and counter-mining patrols.

At the end of September 1914, she was redeployed to the Shetland patrol based out of Scapa Flow. Here she was deployed in anti-submarine operations and defending the main fleet anchorage. In December 1914 she was given the pennant number P13; at the start of September 1915, this was changed to D49.

On 30 June 1917 while on patrol off the Shetland Islands, she struck a contact mine that had been laid by German submarine .  She sank with the loss of 44 officers and men in position .

Notes

References

Bibliography
 
 
 
 
 
 
 
 

 

Ships built on the River Tyne
1897 ships
C-class destroyers (1913)
World War I destroyers of the United Kingdom
World War I shipwrecks in the North Sea
Maritime incidents in 1917
Ships sunk by mines